Silverton is an eastern suburb of Pretoria, South Africa. It lies wedged between the slopes of the Magaliesberg mountain range.

History
The suburb was established in 1890. During the depression, the town's nickname was Blikkiesdorp  because of the numerous shanty dwellings inhabited by poor white farmers. It remained independent of Pretoria until it was incorporated into the city in 1964.

References

Suburbs of Pretoria